Arui may refer to:

 Arui, an alternate name for the Serui-Laut language
 Arui, a French name for the Barbary sheep

See also